Adriano de Paiva (1847–1907)  was a Portuguese scientist who was one of the pioneers of telectroscope. He worked at the Politechnical Academy of Porto and conducted research into selenium as a material to transmit images.

His work followed the discovery of photoconductivity in selenium by Willoughby Smith in 1873. In the 19th century he suggested the use of a chemical that would enable images to be transmitted at a considerable range.

References
 Adriano de Paiva,  
 A small article concerning Portuguese science 

Portuguese physicists
Television pioneers
1847 births
1907 deaths
People from Braga
Videotelephony